The Polynesian Leaders Group (PLG) is an international governmental cooperation group bringing together four independent countries and eight self-governing territories in Polynesia.

The idea of a Polynesian regional grouping had been discussed for several years, notably in response to the Melanesian Spearhead Group, a regional grouping for countries in Melanesia. In September 2011, Samoan Prime Minister Tuilaepa Sa’ilele Malielegaoi initiated a meeting with the leaders of Tonga, Tuvalu, the Cook Islands and Niue on the margins of the Pacific Islands Forum summit in Auckland. These initial talks led to a second meeting in Apia which, on 17 November, led to a memorandum of understanding formally establishing the Polynesian Leaders Group (PLG).

The Group does not have a fixed Secretariat at present, despite initial suggestions that one would be established in Apia. The Group held its first formal meeting in Rarotonga in the Cook Islands in August 2012.

History
The idea of a 'Polynesian Alliance' in order to address social and economic issues within the Pacific has been discussed since the between the 1870s and 1890s when King Kamehameha V of Hawaii, King Pomare V of Tahiti, King Malietoa Laupepa of Samoa and King George Tupou II of Tonga agreed to establish a confederation of Polynesian states, of which did not eventuate.

The idea once again arose in the 1970s with the Kingitanga of New Zealand, an its leader Te Atairangikaahu, reviving the idea of an alliance similar to, but separate from, the Pacific Islands Forum. Fiji and Samoa were also parties to these discussions.

Goals
Memorandum of Understanding
Announcing the launch, Prime Minister Tuilaepa said the member countries would work together "through this group to seek a future for our Polynesian people and countries where cultures, traditions and values are honored and protected. Where sustainable economic prosperity is achieved, where democratic values are observed, human rights promoted and protected as well as upholding the rule of law." It was also announced that the countries would cooperate in the fields of "education, culture and language, transport, environmental conservation and climate change mitigation and adaptation, health, agriculture and fisheries, tourism, trade and investment".

The fourth section of the Memorandum of Understanding read; The meeting decided that through the PLG, members will work together in the spirit of mutual understanding and cooperation to:
Encourage sharing knowledge and experiences in awareness and education to promote and protect cultures, traditions and languages;
Encourage mutual support of development efforts in areas including but not limited to: transport, energy, environmental conservation, climate change, education, health, agriculture and fisheries, tourism, trade and investment;
Encourage respect for the quality of governance, observance of democratic values and human rights rule of law and right to self-determination;
Encourage the strengthening of connections with institutions of regional and international cooperation.

Overseas workers
In 2013, the PLG ended their annual meeting with an announcement pushing New Zealand and Australia to increase its seasonal workers quotas in order for more Pacific peoples to gain seasonal work in these countries.

Membership
There are eight founding members: three sovereign states (Samoa, Tonga and Tuvalu), two self-governing states in free association with New Zealand (the Cook Islands and Niue), an unincorporated territory of the United States (American Samoa), an overseas country of France (French Polynesia), and a nation that is also a dependency of New Zealand (Tokelau).

Expansion 
In June 2018, the Group voted to add three members: the sovereign state of New Zealand, the U.S. state of Hawaii, and the Chilean territory of Easter Island (Rapa Nui). As far back as September 2011, Niuean Premier Toke Talagi had noted that "we consider New Zealand and Hawaii, for example, as being part of the Polynesian Triangle so they could very well be part of the members of this Polynesian Group". Tuilaeapa, while also acknowledging that New Zealand was geographically part of Polynesia, said there might be "complications" to inviting New Zealand into the Group. 

When the new members were formally announced, the Group's then-chairman, Enele Sopoaga, prime minister of Tuvalu, said, "we welcome other Polynesian communities in other places and locations to join the PLG as brothers," and emphasized the need for Polynesian communities to come together to address common problems. Commentators also noted that the addition of New Zealand and Hawaii could bring additional resources to the Group and increase the potential for strategic cooperation with the United States. Further, the addition of Easter Island raised questions about the relationship between the Group's interest in decolonization and Easter Island's political status within Chile.

Potential membership for Fiji

In November 2011, Tuilaeapa stated it had been "decided that a state, territory or an indigenous Polynesian population can be invited to become a member or as an observer by a consensus decision of the founding members". A few days later, discussing the founding of the Group with Radio Australia, Tuilaeapa said that Fiji could be welcomed as a member in future. Despite Fiji being usually considered a Melanesian country just outside the Polynesian Triangle, albeit with a culture and political traditions influenced by Polynesia, Tuilaepa argued that "Fiji is within this triangle and its founding leaders considered themselves as Polynesians. Obviously, the current leadership is leaning towards our Melanesian brothers."

Founding Leaders

Meetings

Leadership 
Chairs

See also
 Melanesian Spearhead Group
 Pacific Islands Forum
 Polynesian Triangle
 Te Wheke-a-Muturangi

References 

International organizations based in Oceania
Organizations established in 2011
Politics of Oceania
Polynesia